Sante Spigarelli (born 31 October 1943) is an Italian archer. He competed at the 1972 Summer Olympics, the 1976 Summer Olympics and the 1980 Summer Olympics.

References

External links
 

1943 births
Living people
Italian male archers
Olympic archers of Italy
Archers at the 1972 Summer Olympics
Archers at the 1976 Summer Olympics
Archers at the 1980 Summer Olympics
Sportspeople from Perugia
20th-century Italian people